Andisheh "Andy" Baraghani (born 1989 or 1990) is an American chef and food writer. Baraghani's first job as a teenager was at the restaurant Chez Panisse in Berkeley, California. He moved across the United States to study at New York University and work in New York City restaurants before transitioning into a career in media in 2013. Following a brief stint as a food editor at Tasting Table, he joined Bon Appétit in 2015 as a senior food editor and soon became a frequent presenter on the publication's YouTube channel. He left Bon Appétit in 2021 to work on a cookbook, The Cook You Want to Be, which was published in 2022 and contains recipes and essays that cover his personal life and career.

Early life 
Andisheh Baraghani was born in 1989 or 1990 and raised in the San Francisco Bay Area. His parents had immigrated from Iran to Berkeley, California in 1977, a year before the Iranian Revolution. When he was young, he often experimented with various foods and played with a Fisher-Price kitchen, his favorite toy as a child. As a teenager, he worked his first job at the Berkeley restaurant Chez Panisse, where he started as an intern and became a line cook in its kitchen. In his time at the restaurant working under Alice Waters—whom he regards as his "culinary idol"—he learned cooking technique and how to be agile and "think methodically." One particular experience Baraghani recalls is when he cried after he could not understand what Waters asked him in French. By the time he graduated from high school, he had worked in three restaurants including Chez Panisse.

Career 
While studying food studies and cultural anthropology at New York University, Baraghani worked as an editor for the food publication Saveur. After he left his job and graduated from university, he worked in the New York City restaurants Frej, Corton, and Estela. He transitioned from a career in the restaurant business into one in the media industry in 2013 and soon after became a food editor for the online publication Tasting Table.

In 2015, he joined Bon Appétit as senior food editor. He was additionally co-editor of Healthyish, a publication by Bon Appétit which focuses on clean eating. When Bon Appétit began to increase its focus on video content in 2016, he started presenting on the publication's YouTube channel with Molly Baz, Sohla El-Waylly, Priya Krishna, Brad Leone, and Claire Saffitz. Baraghani was one of seventeen chefs who operated a Manhattan pop-up restaurant by Google open for four days in April 2016. With musicians Cupcakke and Ella Mai, Baraghani and Baz held cooking demonstrations at the Outside Lands Music and Arts Festival in San Francisco in 2019. In early 2020, the LGBTQ magazine Out published a profile of Baraghani that dubbed him "the internet boyfriend of our dreams".

In June 2020, during the George Floyd protests against police brutality and racism, Bon Appétit editor-in-chief Adam Rapoport resigned after a 2004 photo of him in brownface previously published on Instagram garnered criticism online. Staff members, among other critics on social media, accused the publication and its parent company Condé Nast of discrimination against their employees of color and called for better compensation and treatment. Baraghani himself was accused of microaggressions toward a female Korean American coworker. A few days later, he posted a statement to Instagram in which he criticized the publication's workplace culture and apologized for the ways he had "undermined" and "hurt" BIPOC coworkers, particularly a "former coworker". He continued working at the publication for another year, unlike some coworkers who resigned at the time in protest. Speaking with the Financial Times in 2022, he explained that he came from a "very middle-class family" and accrued a "five-figure college debt", so "Quitting was a privilege I didn't feel I had." He departed the publication in August 2021 to work on a cookbook.

Baraghani's cookbook, The Cook You Want to Be: Everyday Recipes to Impress, was published in 2022 by Lorena Jones Books. The cookbook contains recipes and essays on his childhood, international travels, and career. According to The Mercury News, it "features a wide range of veg-forward, flavor-packed and often unexpected dishes" as well as dishes he ate in his childhood such as aush reshteh, a stew, and chelo (pilaf) with tahdig (scorched rice).

Personal life 
Baraghani is gay. He lives with his partner Keith Pollock, whom he met while they were employed by Condé Nast. Pollock has worked as an executive of Architectural Digest and West Elm, a brand of houseware stores. Baraghani stated in a Bon Appétit article that he had only worked in a kitchen with one other man who was openly gay, despite cooking in "male-led" kitchens through his career, and felt as though kitchens "weren't exactly environments that encouraged me to come out" due to cultural norms of the profession.

References 

20th-century births
21st-century American non-fiction writers
21st-century LGBT people
Living people
American chefs
American male chefs
American cookbook writers
American food writers
American gay writers
Chefs from Berkeley, California
Iranian chefs
Iranian cookbook writers
Iranian non-fiction writers
Iranian writers
LGBT chefs
LGBT people from New York (state)
New York University alumni
People from New York City
Writers from Berkeley, California
Bon Appétit people
American writers of Iranian descent